Lewis Kelly (born April 21, 1977) is a former American football offensive guard for the Minnesota Vikings (2000–2003) and the New York Giants (2005–2006). He was drafted in the seventh round of the 2000 NFL Draft. He attended South Carolina State University, where he joined the Beta Delta chapter of Alpha Phi Alpha fraternity in spring 2000. He has three children.

References 

1977 births
Living people
People from Lithonia, Georgia
American football offensive guards
South Carolina State Bulldogs football players
Sportspeople from DeKalb County, Georgia
Minnesota Vikings players
Frankfurt Galaxy players
New York Giants players
Ed Block Courage Award recipients